The Meloni government is the 68th government of the Italian Republic, the first led by the president of Brothers of Italy, Giorgia Meloni, who is also the first woman to hold the office of Prime Minister of Italy. The government was announced on 21 October 2022 and was officially sworn in on the next day. It was one of the fastest government formations in the history of the Italian Republic. It was variously described as a shift to the political right, as well as the first far-right-led coalition in Italy since World War II.

Supporting parties 
The majority supporting the government consists of the following parties:

History

Government formation 

Immediately after the first meeting of the Italian Parliament's new legislature, tensions began to grow within the centre-right coalition. On 13 October, Silvio Berlusconi refused to support Ignazio La Russa, a politician with a neo-fascist background and the Brothers of Italy (FdI) candidate to be President of the Senate of the Republic. He succeeded in being elected by obtaining 116 votes out of 206 in the first round, thanks to the support from opposition parties to the centre-right coalition. Tensions further grew, in particular between Berlusconi and Giorgia Meloni, whom Berlusconi described as "patronising, overbearing, arrogant" and "offensive" in a series of written notes in the Senate. In the following days, after meetings between parties' leader, tensions loosened and the centre-right coalition parties reached an agreement on the formation of the new cabinet.

On 20 October, consultations between President Sergio Mattarella and parties officially began. On the following day, delegates from FdI, the League (Lega), whose member Lorenzo Fontana had been elected President of the Chamber of Deputies on 14 October), Forza Italia (FI), and the group of Civics of Italy–Us Moderates–MAIE announced to Mattarella they had reached an agreement to form a coalition government with Meloni as Prime Minister. In the afternoon, Mattarella summoned Meloni to the Quirinal Palace, asking her to form a new government. Meloni accepted the task, and on the same day she announced the composition of her government, which was officially sworn in on 22 October. She is the first woman to hold the office of Prime Minister. The government successufully won the confidence vote, held in late October, with a comfortable majority in both houses.

On 25 October, Meloni gave her first official speech as Prime Minister in front of the Chamber of Deputies, before the confidence vote on her government. During her speech, she stressed the weight of being the first woman to serve as head of the Italian government. Meloni thanked several Italian women, notably including Tina Anselmi, Samantha Cristoforetti, Grazia Deledda, Oriana Fallaci, Nilde Iotti, Rita Levi-Montalcini, and Maria Montessori, who she said, "with the boards of their own examples, built the ladder that today allows me to climb and break the heavy glass ceiling placed over our heads." On 31 October, the government nominated its deputy ministers and undersecretaries. Galeazzo Bignami, one of the chosen deputy ministers, caused controversy and garnered international attention as a 2005 photo of him with a Nazi armband became public.

Investiture vote

Domestic policies 
In 2021, the Constitutional Court of Italy held that this was unconstitutional, and this decree law was previously approved in the Chamber on 31 March 2022 but did not make it to the Senate due to the snap elections. One of the first measures implemented by the government regarded COVID-19 and concerned in the complete removal of the COVID-19 vaccination certificate, known in Italy as the Green Pass; moreover, the non-vaccinated doctors were re-integrated into service. Another policy deemed of priority by the new right-wing government is raising the cash ceiling, which critics argue it favours tax evasion and unreported employment, while its proponents including Meloni reject this; a poll by Izi showed that 6 out of 10 right-wing voters agreed that such a law would favour unreported employment.

On 31 October, the government approved a decree providing for a penalty of up to six years of imprisonment for illegal parties and rallies. This came amid anti-fascist protests at La Sapienza University, which were subject of criticism due to the police's response, and a rally in Predappio, where Benito Mussolini is buried, to commemorate the centenary of the March on Rome that led to the takeover of Mussolini and Italian fascism of the government. Despite being officially presented as a decree against illegal rave parties, the law was applicable to any gathering over 50 people that the public authority deemed dangerous, which garnered criticism, including from jurist Vitalba Azzolini. The decree also caused protests from opposition parties and civil rights associations; according to Amnesty International, the decree "risked undermining the right to peaceful protest", while Giuseppe Conte of the Five Star Movement compared it to a police state. The law was also contested by FI, which asked for changes, including the reduction of sentences to four years, while it was mainly supported by FdI and Lega, and FdI's justice minister Carlo Nordio was reportedly upset by the law.

Party breakdown

Ministers

Ministers and other members 
 Brothers of Italy (FdI): Prime minister, 9 ministers, 4 deputy ministers, 14 undersecretaries
 League (Lega): 5 ministers, 2 deputy ministers, 9 undersecretaries
 Forza Italia (FI): 5 ministers, 2 deputy ministers, 6 undersecretaries
 Independents: 5 ministers, 1 undersecretary
 Us Moderates (NM): 2  undersecretaries

Geographical breakdown 

 Northern Italy: 15 ministers
 Lombardy: 5 ministers
 Piedmont: 3 ministers
 Veneto: 3 ministers
 Emilia-Romagna: 2 ministers
 Friuli-Venezia Giulia: 1 minister
 Liguria: 1 minister
 Central Italy: 5 ministers (including PM)
 Lazio: 5 ministers (including PM)
 Southern and Insular Italy: 5 ministers
 Campania: 2 ministers
 Apulia: 1 minister
 Sardinia: 1 minister
 Sicily: 1 minister

Council of Ministers

Composition

References 

 
2022 establishments in Italy
Cabinets established in 2022
Current governments
Italian governments
Cabinet